Salacia reticulata is a flowering plant of the genus Salacia native to Sri Lanka and the Andaman Islands. It grows in dry zone forests in Sri Lanka. In ayurvedic medicine, it is known as kothala himbutu (කොතල හිඹුටු) in Sinhala.

Description
Salacia reticulata is a climbing, perennial, woody shrub. The plant has dichotomous branching pattern. The bark is smooth, greenish grey in colour, thin, and white internally. The leaves are opposite and elliptic-oblong. The leaves have acute bases, abruptly acuminate apexes, and a margin with minute rounded teeth. The flowers are bisexual and arranged in clusters of 2-8 in the leaf axils. They are greenish-white to greenish-yellow in color. The fruit is a drupe which is globose and tubercular. The drupe assumes a pinkish-orange color on ripening. There are 1–4 seeds, each resembling an almond.

References

reticulata
Flora of Sri Lanka
Flora of the Andaman Islands
Plants used in Ayurveda